Sir William de Wiveleslie Abney  (24 July 1843 – 3 December 1920) was an English astronomer, chemist, and photographer.

Life and career
Abney was born in Derby, England, the son of Rev. Edward Henry Abney (1811–1892), vicar of St Alkmund's Church, Derby, and his wife, Catharine Strutt. His father was owner of the Firs Estate. William was educated at Rossall School, the Royal Military Academy, Woolwich, and joined the Royal Engineers in 1861, with which he served in India for several years. Thereafter, and to further his knowledge in photography, he became a chemical assistant at the Chatham School of Military Engineering.

Abney was a pioneer of several technical aspects of photography. His father had been an early photographic experimenter and friend of Richard Keene, an early Derby photographer. Keene became a close friend of William and his brother Charles Edward Abney (1850–1914). Both Abney sons subsequently became founder members of the Derby Photographic Society in June 1884. His endeavors in the chemistry of photography produced useful photographic products and also developments in astronomy. He wrote many books on photography that were considered standard texts at the time, although he was doubtful that his improvements would have a great impact on the subject.

Abney investigated the blackening of a negative to incidental light. In 1874, Abney developed a dry photographic emulsion, which replaced "wet" emulsions. He used this emulsion in an Egyptian expedition to photograph the transit of Venus across the sun. In 1880, he introduced hydroquinone. Abney also introduced new and useful types of photographic paper, including in 1882 a formula for gelatin silver chloride paper. He was elected a Fellow of the Royal Society in 1876.

Abney conducted early research into the field of spectroscopy, developing a red-sensitive emulsion which was used for the infrared spectra of organic molecules. He was also a pioneer in photographing the infrared solar spectrum (1887), as well as researching sunlight in the medium of the atmosphere.

In 1893 he inherited Meashan Hall from a rich aunt.

He became assistant secretary to the Board of Education in 1899 and advisor to that body in 1903. In 1900 he was Director of the Science and Art Department. He sold his father's estate, most of which went for housing in the St Luke's Parish of Derby, but retained 11 acres until 1913 when they were purchased by the Council to become the site of Rykneld Secondary Modern School and Rykneld recreation ground.

Abney invented the "Abney level", a combined clinometer and spirit level, used by surveyors to measure slopes and angles. He was responsible for the "Abney mounting" of a concave grating spectrograph in which the photographic plate was fixed and the entry slit moved to accommodate different regions of the spectrum.

He died on 3 December 1920 in Folkestone, England. He is buried in the churchyard of Holy Trinity Church in Folkestone.

Family

He had married twice: firstly in 1864 to Agnes Matilda Smith (died 1888) with whom he had a son and two daughters, and secondly in 1890 to Mary Louisa Mead with whom he had a further daughter.

Publications
 Chemistry for Engineers, 1870.
 Thebes and its five greater temples, London, published by Sampson Low, Marston, Searle & Rivington, 1876.
 W. de W. Abney, Instruction in Photography, London, published by S. Low, Marston & company, 1900.
 A New Developer, Photographic News, 1880, 24:345.
 W. de W. Abney and E. R. Festing, Intensity of Radiation through Turbid Media, Proceedings of the Royal Society of London, Volume 40, pages 378–380, 1886. Published by The Royal Society.
 W. de W. Abney and E. R. Festing, Colour Photometry. Part III.Proceedings of the Royal Society of London, Volume 50, pages 369–372, 1891–1892. Published by The Royal Society.

Organizations and honours
1876 Fellow of the Royal Society 
1878 Received first Progress Medal of the Photographic Society of Great Britain ever
1885 Fellow of the Royal Society of Edinburgh
1892 to 1894, 1896 and 1903 to 1905 President of the Photographic Society of Great Britain aka Royal Photographic Society  
1893 to 1895 President of the Royal Astronomical Society
1895 to 1897 President of the Physical Society of London 
 CB : Companion of the Order of the Bath
 KCB: Knight Commander (civil division) of the Order of the Bath (KCB) - announced in the 1900 New Year Honours honours list on 1 January 1900, gazetted on 16 January 1900, and invested by Queen Victoria at Windsor Castle on 1 March 1900.
 Doctor of Science (D.Sc. Honoris causa) from the University of Dublin - June 1902.
1909 to 1920 Vice-President of Girls' Public Day School Trust

See also
 Abney effect

References

Further reading
 "Abney, William de Wiveleslie." Britannica Student Encyclopedia. 2004.  Encyclopædia Britannica.
 

 Klaus Hentschel: Mapping the Spectrum. Techniques of Visual Representation in Research and Teaching, Oxford: OUP 2002.online preview; search for Abney
 Article about the Abney family home, with information about the family

External links 

 
 
 
 

19th-century English photographers
1843 births
1920 deaths
Burials in Kent
Color scientists
Photographers from Derbyshire
Military personnel from Derbyshire
19th-century British astronomers
19th-century British chemists
Fellows of the Royal Society
Fellows of the Royal Society of Edinburgh
Graduates of the Royal Military Academy, Woolwich
Knights Commander of the Order of the Bath
People educated at Rossall School
People from Derby
Presidents of the Girls' Day School Trust
Presidents of the Physical Society
Presidents of the Royal Astronomical Society
Royal Engineers officers
Spectroscopists
Manchester Literary and Philosophical Society